Stine Frantzen (born 29 January 1984 in Hårstad) is a Norwegian footballer.
She competed at the 2005 UEFA Women's European Championship.

References

External links 
stine frantzen alamy

Norwegian women's footballers
Living people
1984 births
Women's association footballers not categorized by position
Norway women's international footballers